Soul Dance! is the fifth album led by saxophonist Houston Person, which was recorded in 1968 and released on the Prestige label.

Reception

Allmusic awarded the album 3 stars, stating: "Although not as well produced or engineered as his '70s and '80s Muse recordings, this late '60s date is vintage Houston Person. He's doing the same mix of blues, ballads, and soul jazz cuts as always, although with a little less confidence, edge, and control than he displays on later albums".

Track listing 
All compositions by Houston Person except where noted
 "Snake Eyes" - 5:22   
 "Never Let Me Go" (Ray Evans, Jay Livingston) - 4:55  
 "Groovin' and A-Groovin'" - 5:04  
 "What a Diff'rence a Day Made" (Stanley Adams, María Grever) - 5:57  
 "Soul Dance" - 3:58  
 "Here's That Rainy Day" (Johnny Burke, Jimmy Van Heusen) - 6:03  
 "Teardrops from My Eyes" (Rudy Toombs) - 4:58  
 "Blue 7" (Sonny Rollins) - 5:26

Personnel 
Houston Person - tenor saxophone
Billy Gardner - organ
Joe Jones - guitar
Frankie Jones - drums

References 

Houston Person albums
1969 albums
Prestige Records albums
Albums recorded at Van Gelder Studio
Albums produced by Bob Porter (record producer)